The following is a list of film festivals in China.
 BigScreen Festival, first held in 2004 in Padua, Italy, but now held in the city of Kunming
Hong Kong National Film Festival
Beijing College Student Film Festival
Beijing Independent Film Festival
Beijing International Film Festival
Beijing Queer Film Festival
Changchun Film Festival
China International New Media Short Film Festival
CINEMQ, Shanghai
Guangzhou International Documentary Film Festival
Hainan International Film Festival
Hong Kong Asian Film Festival
Hong Kong Independent Short Film and Video Awards (IFVA)
Hong Kong International Film Festival
Hong Kong Lesbian & Gay Film Festival
Huading Awards
Macau International Movie Festival
Pingyao International Film Festival
Shanghai International Film Festival
ShanghaiPRIDE Film Festival
Shanghai Queer Film Festival (from September 2017)
Mountain Lu International Romantic Film Festival

 
China
Lists of tourist attractions in China
China
Lists of festivals in China
Festivals